is an online free-to-play role-playing game developed by Genki and published by Square Enix. It was released in Japan on January 21, 2016 for Android and iOS devices. The game was released worldwide on March 2, 2018 in South Korea, China, North America and Europe by Flero Games, a Korean publisher. An anime television series adaptation by Brain's Base, titled Grimms Notes the Animation, premiered from January 10 to March 28, 2019; the anime series is licensed in North America by Sentai Filmworks.

Gameplay
Grimms Notes is a side-scrolling role-playing game. The player controls a party of characters based on fairy tales and stories such as Little Red Riding Hood and Cinderella. The player directly controls the main character, moving them around the battle screen and attacking enemies, while the game controls the other party members. As characters defeat enemies they charge a skill meter, with the player activating the character's unique skill, both for the main character and others, when fully charged.

The game features a "Soul System", wherein each character has two "souls" equipped, equivalent to jobs or character classes. In between battles the player can change which souls are equipped.

Plot
In the game, the player and the fairy tale characters band together to combat "Chaos Tellers", which are rewriting the fairy tale stories and changing fate. Fairy tales include characters from such stories as Alice in Wonderland, Cinderella, and Little Red Riding Hood.

Release
The game was released in Japan on January 21, 2016 for Android and iOS devices. It was released worldwide on March 2, 2018 in South Korea, China, North America and Europe by Flero Games, a Korean publisher. On January 10, 2019 the global version was shut down. The Japanese version closed its services on June 17, 2020. Later, a free offline application was released, which made it available to read every cutscene ever released without the gameplay.

Reception
The game was downloaded two million times in four days, and over 15 million times total in Japan.

Other media

Anime
An anime television series adaptation titled Grimms Notes the Animation was announced in 2018, which Square Enix had indicated that it would not be a short-form anime series. The series premiered from January 10 to March 28, 2019 on TBS and BS-TBS. The series is animated by Brain's Base and is directed by Seiki Sugawara, with Hiroshi Yamaguchi handling series composition, Kentaro Matsumoto handling character designs, and Fumiyuki Go is the sound director. Ayana Taketatsu performs the series' opening theme song "Innocent Notes", while i☆Ris performs the series' ending theme song "Endless Notes". In North America, Crunchyroll simulcasts the series and Sentai Filmworks will release the series on home video.

Cast

Known as Ex for short, a resident from Cinderella story, whose book of fate was blank, he is Attacker class.

A resident from an unknown story, she is the leader of the group, her purpose is to "tune" every stories back to normal and stop Chaos Storyteller from destroying it, she is Healer class.

A resident from Momotaro story and a friend of previous Momotaro, his favorite motto is consider his group as Tao family, he is Defender class.

A resident from Momotaro story as well, she was a demon with no horns as remembered by Onihime, she is Shooter class.

 Red Riding Hood

 Snow White

Episode list

Notes

Other works
Another game under development called Grimms Echoes, will be one series but not direct sequel to Grimms Notes as it develops a completely new story. It scheduled to release on March 28, 2019.

References

External links
 
 

2016 video games
Android (operating system) games
Anime television series based on video games
Brain's Base
Crunchyroll anime
iOS games
Japanese role-playing video games
Sentai Filmworks
Square Enix games
TBS Television (Japan) original programming
Video games developed in Japan